Geoffrey "Geoff" Clarkson (12 August 1943 – 10 July 2001) was an English rugby union, and professional rugby league footballer who played in the 1960s, 1970s and 1980s.

Background
Geoff Clarkson was born in Wakefield, West Riding of Yorkshire, England and he died aged 57 in Huddersfield, West Yorkshire, England.

Playing career
Geoff Clarkson turned professional with Wakefield Trinity in 1965 after gaining Yorkshire County rugby union forward honours while at Wakefield RFC.

Geoff Clarkson won cap(s) for Yorkshire (RL) while at Wakefield Trinity.

Geoff Clarkson played left-, i.e. number 11, in Wakefield Trinity's 21-9 victory over St. Helens in the Championship Final replay during the 1966–67 season at Station Road, Swinton on Wednesday 10 May 1967.

Geoff Clarkson played right-, i.e. number 12, in Leigh's 7-4 victory over St. Helens in the 1970 Lancashire County Cup Final during the 1970–71 season at Station Road, Swinton on Saturday 28 November 1970, played right- in Leigh's 24-7 victory over Leeds in the 1971 Challenge Cup Final during the 1970–71 season at Wembley Stadium, London on Saturday 15 May 1971, in front of a crowd of 85,514, and played right- in Leigh's 8-3 victory over Widnes in the 1981 Lancashire County Cup Final during the 1981–82 season at Central Park, Wigan on Saturday 26 September 1981.

Geoff Clarkson played left-, i.e. number 11, in Hull Kingston Rovers' 3-13 defeat by Hull F.C. in the 1979 BBC2 Floodlit Trophy Final during the 1979–80 season at The Boulevard, Hull on Tuesday 18 December 1979.

Geoff Clarkson extended his record number of transfers to 12 when he left Leigh for Featherstone Rovers on 27 October 1983. He played for 10 different English clubs, and also had a brief spell in Australia, he was 40 years old when he finished playing regular first team rugby in 1983–84.

Club career
Geoff Clarkson made his début for Wakefield Trinity during December 1965, he played his last match (during his second spell) for Wakefield Trinity during the 1977–78 season, he made his début for Leigh during the 1970–71 season, he played his last match (during his second spell) for Leigh on Thursday 27 October 1983, during the 1983–84 season, he made his début for Warrington on Friday 20 August 1971, he played his last match for Warrington on Sunday 22 October 1972, he made his début for Featherstone Rovers on Sunday 30 October 1983, he played his last match for Featherstone Rovers during the 1983–84 season, he appears to have scored no drop-goals (or field-goals as they are currently known in Australasia), but prior to the 1974–75 season all goals, whether; conversions, penalties, or drop-goals, scored 2-points, consequently prior to this date drop-goals were often not explicitly documented, therefore '0' drop-goals may indicate drop-goals not recorded, rather than no drop-goals scored.

References

External links
The Independent – Geoff Clarkson Obituary
(archived by web.archive.org) Rugby League Journal – Issue 24 – Autumn 2008
(archived by web.archive.org) Geoff Clarkson, the much-travelled forward, has died at the age of 57
Yorkshire RFU
Photograph "Stan Fearnley - Stan Fearnley, Northern's Loose Forward, well held with Clarkson, Stockwell and Diabira in support. - Date: 31/01/1970" at rlhp.co.uk
Photograph "Trotter looks to offload - Denis Trotter looks to offload watched by Geoff Clarkson. - Date: 23/10/1977" at rlhp.co.uk
Statistics at orl-heritagetrust.org.uk
Statistics at wolvesplayers.thisiswarrington.co.uk
Statistics at wolvesplayers.thisiswarrington.co.uk (martini)
 (archived by web.archive.org) Statistics at wolvesplayers.thisiswarrington.co.uk
 (archived by web.archive.org) Statistics at wolvesplayers.thisiswarrington.co.uk (martini)
Search for "Geoffrey Clarkson" at britishnewspaperarchive.co.uk
Search for "Geoff Clarkson" at britishnewspaperarchive.co.uk

1943 births
2001 deaths
Bradford Bulls players
Bramley RLFC players
English rugby league players
English rugby union players
Featherstone Rovers players
Hull Kingston Rovers players
Leeds Rhinos players
Leigh Leopards players
Oldham R.L.F.C. players
Rugby league players from Wakefield
Rugby league second-rows
Rugby union players from Wakefield
Wakefield RFC players
Wakefield Trinity players
Warrington Wolves players
York Wasps players
Yorkshire rugby league team players
Yorkshire County RFU players